Elbert Isaiah "Red" Schillings (March 29, 1900 – January 7, 1954) was a Major League Baseball pitcher who made four appearances, all in relief, in  with the Philadelphia Athletics.

External links

1900 births
1954 deaths
Major League Baseball pitchers
Baseball players from Texas
Philadelphia Athletics players
People from Deport, Texas